Jon Gisle (born 19 November 1948) is a Norwegian jurist, encyclopedist and philologist.

Biography
He is cand.philol. (1974) and cand.jur. (1998) from the University of Oslo. He was publishing editor from 1977 to 1980 in Kunnskapsforlaget. Between 2003 and 2008, Gisle was judge in the Labour Court of Norway. Since 2008, he has had his own lawyer practice in Oslo in the lawyer fellowship Arbeidsrettsadvokatene.

Gisle is also famous for being a cartoon expert, and in 1973 he published the Donald Duck analysis Donaldismen: En muntert-vitenskapelig studie over Donald Duck og hans verden, in which he introduced the term "Donaldism."

In 1986, Gisle founded with others the cartoon periodical TEGN, in which he was editor-in-chief the first years.

See also
Donaldism

References

External links
List of publications

1948 births
Living people
University of Oslo alumni
21st-century Norwegian judges
Norwegian encyclopedists
Norwegian magazine editors